The 2020 Oceania Rugby Under 20s was only contested in the Trophy division where Samoa won their first under-20 title by defeating Tonga in a one-off match played in February at Apia Park. The Championship division, originally planned for 27 May to 6 June, was postponed and then cancelled due to travel and public health restrictions in place for the COVID-19 pandemic. Teams from Australia, New Zealand, Fiji and Japan had been scheduled to play at Bond University on the Gold Coast.

Trophy match

References

External links
Oceania Rugby website 

2020
2020 rugby union tournaments for national teams
2020 in Oceanian rugby union
2020 in Samoan rugby union
2020 in Tongan rugby union
Sports competitions in Samoa
2020 in youth sport
International rugby union competitions hosted by Samoa